Joshua Allen (born March 13, 1989) is an American dancer and actor, best known as the winner of the fourth season of So You Think You Can Dance. He had originally auditioned in Dallas, Texas with his friend and fellow contestant, Comfort Fedoke. Allen was announced winner of the show on August 7, 2008, winning $250,000.

Early life
Allen was born in Fort Worth, Texas. He first started to dance in third grade, at the age of 8. One of his early influences was Michael Jackson, whom Allen emulated by doing the Moonwalk. He also excelled at sports and played football and track.  After changing high schools, however, Allen decided to focus on his first love: dance.

So You Think You Can Dance Season 4
On So You Think You Can Dance, he was paired up with Katee Shean, Courtney Galiano, Chelsie Hightower, and Stephen "tWitch" Boss. Along with Katee, he made the final four without an appearance in the Bottom 3 couples or Bottom 4 contestants. While on the show, Allen did performances in hip-hop, broadway, samba, contemporary, west coast swing, Viennese Waltz, rumba, Argentine tango, disco, lyrical jazz, and jive. Allen performed the first Bollywood dance and trepak of America's So You Think You Can Dance, with Katee and tWitch, respectively.

Allen had some training in different dance styles, including modern, ballet, and jazz. On July 30, 2009, Allen returned, along with fellow Season 4 contestant Chelsie Hightower, to perform their Emmy nominated Argentine Tango, choreographed by Season 2 contestant Dmitry Chaplin.

Post-SYTYCD

As part of his prize for winning SYTYCD Season 4, Allen appeared as a featured dancer in Step Up 3D, along with fellow finalists Katee Shean and Stephen 'tWitch' Boss. He also appeared in the dance comedy Freak Dance. In 2010, Allen took part in Season 2 of Oxygen's Dance Your Ass Off as one of the show's pros. Allen was a featured dancer in the 2011 remake of the musical/movie Footloose. Allen has appeared in videos and commercials for Honda, McDonald's, and the US Census. Joshua has also been featured as a dancer on numerous TV shows, including Community and American Horror Story.

In July 2016, Allen was indicted for felony assault of his girlfriend and assault with a deadly weapon. Prior to this time, he had been charged with multiple misdemeanor domestic violence counts. He pleaded "no contest" to the charges and was sentenced in August 2017 to one year in county jail.

References

So You Think You Can Dance winners
Living people
1989 births
African-American male dancers
African-American dancers
American male dancers
People from Fort Worth, Texas
So You Think You Can Dance (American TV series) contestants
21st-century American dancers
21st-century African-American people
20th-century African-American people